Matthew Gavin Frank (born 1976) is an American writer, specializing in creative nonfiction, the lyric essay, literary food and travel writing, and poetry.

Life
Matthew Gavin Frank grew up in Illinois, before graduating from Arizona State University with an MFA.

He has previously taught at Grand Valley State University and continues to teach in the English department at Northern Michigan University, where he is also the Nonfiction and Hybrid Editor of the literary journal Passages North.

His nonfiction books include, Flight of the Diamond Smugglers: A Tale of Pigeons, Obsession, and Greed Along Coastal South Africa (2021) — named a finalist for the Heartland Booksellers Award in Nonfiction and an NPR Best Book of 2021 —, The Mad Feast (2015), Preparing the Ghost (2014), Pot Farm (2012), and Barolo (2010). Frank's books of poetry include, The Morrow Plots (2013), Warranty in Zulu (2010), and Sagittarius Agitprop (2009).

Frank's work has appeared in numerous magazines, including The New Republic, Conjunctions, The Iowa Review, Gulf Coast, The Kenyon Review, Salon, and Gastronomica and has been anthologized in The Best Travel Writing, Best Food Writing, and Creative Nonfiction: The Best of Brevity.

Bibliography 
 Aardvark, West Town Press, 2007
 
 Sagittarius Agitprop, Black Lawrence Press / Dzanc Books, 2009,  
 
 Warranty in Zulu, Barrow Street Press, 2010, 
  
 The Morrow Plots, Black Lawrence Press / Dzanc Books, 2013, 
  
 The Mad Feast: An Ecstatic Tour Through America's Food. Liveright. 27 October 2015. .

References

External links 
 Official Website
 
 
 

Living people
1976 births
American male writers
Northern Michigan University faculty